Anton Krešić (born 29 January 1996) is a German-born Croatian football player who plays for Rijeka.

Club career

Atalanta

Loan to Trapani
On 11 July 2016, Krešić was loaned to Serie B club Trapani on a season-long loan deal. On 1 October he made his professional debut in the Serie B for Trapani as a substitute replacing Caio de Cenco in the 85th minute of a 2–0 home defeat against Cittadella. On 24 December he played his first entire match for Trapani, a 3–1 away defeat against Cesena. Krešić ended his season-long loan to Trapani with 11 appearances, including 10 as a starter.

Loan to Avellino
On 15 July 2017, Krešić was signed by Serie B side Avellino on a season-long loan deal. On 15 September he made his Serie B debut for Avellino as a substitute replacing Leonardo Morosini in the 64th minute of a 3–1 away defeat against Cesena. On 18 September he played his first entire match for Avellino, a 1–1 home draw against Venezia. On 30 September, Krešić scored his first professional goal in the 53rd minute of a 3–2 home win over Empoli. On 8 October he scored his second goal in the 65th minute of a 2–1 away defeat against Bari. On 15 October he scored his third goal in the 48th minute of a 3–2 home defeat against Salernitana. Krešić ended his loan to Avellino with 25 appearances and 3 goals.

Loan to Cremonese 
On 12 July 2018 he was loaned once again in Serie B, this time to Cremonese.

Loan to Carpi
On 8 January 2019 he joined Serie B club Carpi on loan.

Loan to Padova
On 11 July 2019, Krešić joined Padova on loan with an option to buy. On 27 August 2020 the loan was renewed for the 2020–21 season.

Rijeka
On 16 July 2021, he moved to Rijeka on a season-long loan with an option to buy. He returned to Rijeka on a permanent basis on 2 July 2022.

International
He was on the roster for Croatia at the 2013 UEFA European Under-17 Championship.

Career statistics

Club

References

External links
 
 

1996 births
Living people
People from Dieburg
Sportspeople from Darmstadt (region)
Footballers from Hesse
German people of Croatian descent
Association football defenders
German footballers
Croatian footballers
Croatia youth international footballers
Trapani Calcio players
U.S. Avellino 1912 players
U.S. Cremonese players
A.C. Carpi players
Calcio Padova players
HNK Rijeka players
Serie B players
Serie C players
Croatian Football League players
Croatian expatriate footballers
Expatriate footballers in Italy
Croatian expatriate sportspeople in Italy